Boytsov (masculine) or Boytsova (feminine) is a Russian surname. Notable people with the surname include:

Denis Boytsov (born 1986), Russian boxer
Arkady Boytsov (1923–2000), Russian Soviet Korean War flying ace

Russian-language surnames